Fulladu West is one of the ten districts of the Central River Division of the Gambia.

References 

Central River Division
Districts of the Gambia